The 2001 Italian Open women's singles took place May 14–20, 2001.

Monica Seles was the reigning champion, but she did not defend her title.

Jelena Dokic won in the final 7–6(7–3), 6–1 against Amélie Mauresmo.

Seeds

Draw

Finals

Top half

Section 1

Section 2

Bottom half

Section 3

Section 4

External links
 Draws

Women's Singles
Italian Open - Singles